Sincosite is a green mineral discovered in 1922. It is named for Sincos, Daniel Alcides Carrión Province, Peru, where it was first discovered.

References

Phosphate minerals
Calcium minerals
Vanadium minerals
Tetragonal minerals
Minerals in space group 134